The University of Iowa College of Law is the law school of the University of Iowa, located in Iowa City, Iowa. It was founded in 1865. Iowa is ranked the 28th-best law school in the United States by the U.S. News & World Report "Best Law School" rankings.

History

Iowa's College of Law is said to have graduated the first female law student in the nation, Mary Beth Hickey, in 1873. The second woman to graduate from Iowa Law was Mary Humphrey Haddok in 1875, who later became the first woman admitted to practice before the U.S. District and Circuit Courts. Alexander G. Clark, Jr. was the first African American to graduate from the law school, and his father Alexander G. Clark was the second. The senior Clark was ambassador to Liberia in 1890–1891.

When the Law Building was built in 1986, the project included a low-rise library, classrooms, auditoriums, moot courts, and administrative facilities. The architect was Gunnar Birkets & Associates and the structural engineer was Leslie E. Robertson Associates. The law library has the second-largest collection of volumes and volume-equivalents and the second or third largest number of unique individual cataloged volume and volume-equivalent titles among all law school libraries. It contains more than one million volumes and volume equivalents and is one of the largest and finest collections of print, microform, and electronic legal materials in the United States.

For more than 30 yrs, the law school has sponsored "Bridging the Gap," a minority pre-law conference held at the law school.  It participates in, and supports, CLEO and PLSI.

The Boyd Law Building is located in the center of the campus on a bluff overlooking the Iowa River.

Law journals
The Law School sponsors features four academic journals, including the Iowa Law Review, founded in 1915 as the Iowa Law Bulletin. It is a scholarly legal journal, analyzing developments in the law and suggesting future paths for the law to follow. The Iowa Law Review ranks high among the top "high impact" legal periodicals in the country, and its subscribers include legal practitioners and law libraries throughout the world.
 Iowa Law Review, ranked 12th overall law review in Washington and Lee University School of Law's index of legal journals.
 Journal of Corporation Law, ranked 2nd overall law review in Washington and Lee University School of law's index of legal journals in the area of corporations and associations.
 Transnational Law & Contemporary Problems
 Journal of Gender, Race & Justice

Employment
According to the Iowa College of Law's official 2019 ABA-required disclosures, 89.3% of the Class of 2019 obtained full-time, long-term, JD-required employment within nine months after graduation. Iowa's Law School Transparency under-employment score is 5.7%, indicating the percentage of the Class of 2019 unemployed, pursuing an additional degree, or working in a non-professional, short-term, or part-time job nine months after graduation.

Costs
The total tuition and mandatory fees for the 2018–2019 academic year are $27,344 for Iowa residents and $46,824 for non-resident students.

Notable alumni 
James H. Andreasen (1958), Justice of the Iowa Supreme Court (1987–1998) 
Bruce Braley (1983), U.S. Representative (D-IA)
Christopher Brown (author) (1991), science fiction writer
James H. Carter (1960), Justice of the Iowa Supreme Court (1982–2006) 
Alexander Clark (1884), U.S. Ambassador to Liberia;  successfully litigated Iowa state desegregation case nearly ninety years before Brown v. Board of Education (1954) 
Norm Coleman (1976), former U.S. Senator (R-MN) 
Bill Crews (1977) Mayor of Melbourne, Iowa (1984-1998); Advisory Neighborhood Commissioner, Washington, DC, (2003-2005,2011-2012); DC Zoning Administrator (2005-2007)
Lester J. Dickinson (1899), U.S. Representative (1919–1931), and U.S. Senator (1931–1937) 
Rita B. Garman (1968), Justice of the Illinois Supreme Court
Theodore G. Garfield (1917), Justice of the Iowa Supreme Court (1941–1969), Chief Justice (1961–1969)
K. David Harris (1951), Justice of the Iowa Supreme Court (1972–1999)
John Hammill (1897), served three terms as the 24th Governor of Iowa from 1925 to 1931
William Cook Hanson (1935), Senior federal district judge (1962–1995) 
Paul P. Harris, founder of Rotary International 
Bourke B. Hickenlooper (1922), former Iowa governor (1943–1945), and U.S. Senator (1945–1969) 
 Paula Hicks-Hudson, lawyer, Toledo, Ohio Mayor and former Toledo City Council President
Leo A. Hoegh (1932), former Iowa governor (1955–1957), Director of the Office of Civil and Defense Mobilization, and member of National Security Council 
Brian H. Hook (1999), former Special Assistant to President George W. Bush, and senior advisor to the U.S. Ambassador to the United Nations from 2006 to 2008 
William S. Kenyon (1890), U.S. Senator (1911–1922), and circuit judge for the United States Court of Appeals for the Eighth Circuit (1922–1933) 
Nile Kinnick (1940, attended), 1939 Heisman Trophy winner, 1939 Maxwell Award winner, consensus All-American, World War II veteran, inducted into the College Football Hall of Fame, and 1939 AP Male Athlete of the Year.
Keith Kreiman (1978), former member of both the Iowa House of Representatives (1993–2003) and the Iowa Senate (2003–2011)
Jerry L. Larson (1960), Justice of the Iowa Supreme Court (1978–2008)
Donald P. Lay (1951), circuit judge for the United States Court of Appeals for the Eighth Circuit (1966–2007), Chief Justice (1980–1992) 
Ronald Earl Longstaff (1965), Senior federal district court judge (1991–present)
Thomas E. Martin (1927), U.S. Representative (1939–1955), and U.S. Senator (1955–1961) 
Edward J. McManus (1942), Senior federal district court judge (1962–2017) 
Michael J. Melloy (1974), Federal judge on the United States Court of Appeals for the Eighth Circuit 
Ronald Moon (1965), Chief Justice of the Supreme Court of Hawaii (1993–2010)
W. Ward Reynoldson (1948), Justice of the Iowa Supreme Court (1971–1987), Chief Justice (1978–1987) 
Tom Riley (1952), Iowa politician and trial attorney 
Coleen Rowley (1980), Retired FBI Special Agent and Time Magazine 2002 Woman of the Year
Rob Sand (2010), 33rd Iowa State Auditor
Frederick "Duke" Slater (1928), All-American College Football Player, and second African-American municipal judge in Chicago, IL 
Bruce M. Snell, Jr. (1956), Justice of the Iowa Supreme Court (1987–2001)
Daniel F. Steck (1906), U.S. Senator (1926–1931) 
Roy L. Stephenson (1940), Chief federal district court judge, Southern District of Iowa (1960–1971), and circuit judge of the United States Court of Appeals for the Eighth Circuit (1971–1982) 
William C. Stuart (1942), Senior federal district court judge (1971–2010) 
Philip W. Tone (1948), Federal judge on the United States Court of Appeals for the Seventh Circuit 
Harold Vietor (1958), Senior federal district court judge (1979–present) 
Thomas D. Waterman (1984), Justice of the Iowa Supreme Court (2011–present)
George A. Wilson (1907), Governor of Iowa (1939–42), and U.S. Senator (1943–1949) 
Charles R. Wolle (1961), Justice of the Iowa Supreme Court (1983–1987) and senior federal district judge (1987–2021)

Notable faculty
Austin Adams (1875–1890), lecturer and Justice of the Iowa Supreme Court from 1876 to 1887.
David Baldus (1969–2011), notable academic in the field of Capital Punishment whose research was a key component in Furman v. Georgia (1972)
Willard L. Boyd (1954–Present), President Emeritus of the University of Iowa and the Field Museum of Natural History
Eugene A. Gilmore (1929–1935) dean of the University of Iowa Law School, and President of the University of Iowa from 1934 to 1940
Herbert F. Goodrich (1914–1922), co-founder of the Iowa Law Review, and circuit judge for the United States Court of Appeals for the Third Circuit (1940–1947)
Herbert Hovenkamp (1986–2017), expert in Antitrust law
A. Leo Levin (1919–2015), also law professor at the University of Pennsylvania Law School
Emlin McClain (1881–1901), dean of the University of Iowa Law School from 1890 to 1901 and 1914–1915, co-founder of the Iowa Law Review, and Justice of the Iowa Supreme Court (1901–1914)
Wiley B. Rutledge (1935–1939), dean of the University of Iowa Law School, and Justice of the Supreme Court of the United States (1943–1949)
Eugene Wambaugh (1889–1892), introduced the Langdell case method to the University of Iowa Law School, and published the first Iowa casebook

References

 
Law schools in Iowa
University of Iowa
Educational institutions established in 1865
1865 establishments in Iowa